RM Condor is a large Royal Marines base located near Arbroath in East Angus, Scotland. The base also houses  7 (Sphinx) Battery Royal Artillery, part of 29 Commando Regiment Royal Artillery.

History
The base was first constructed as a Fleet Air Arm base in 1938, when it was known as RNAS Arbroath (HMS Condor). It was opened on 19 June 1940. From the outset it was a training base, primarily involved in the training of naval aviators. A purpose-built 'aircraft carrier' sized landing area was constructed on the airfield and it, along with another similar facility at nearby East Haven, Angus, HMS Peewit was used to train aircrew in deck landing operations. In October, 1940, the base was attacked by Luftwaffe He-111 bombers, operating from Norway, which resulted in minor damage (then valued at £1000) being sustained to some Squadron buildings. Throughout the war years the base was additionally used as a rest area. Operational Squadrons from aircraft carriers would take it in turn to spend rest periods whilst their ships were undergoing maintenance at Scottish Naval ship repair facilities. 

Flying stopped in 1954 and the base became the home of the Royal Navy Aircraft Engineering Training School which had transferred from HMS Daedalus at Lee-on-Solent, Hampshire. It continued in this role until 1 April 1971 when the base became the home to 45 Commando Royal Marines, a part of 3 Commando Brigade.

The base was thereafter known as RM Condor or Condor Barracks and remains an operational base to this day.

A Better Defence Estate, published in November 2016, indicated that the Ministry of Defence would dispose of the airfield section of RM Condor by 2024.  In 2019, this decision was dropped, and the site will remain in use.

Units
The following units have been based here:

 M Flight 3 CDO BDE Air Sqn RM

Based units

Units based at RM Condor.

45 Commando, Royal Marines
30 Commando Information Exploitation Group
7 (Sphinx) Battery. 29 Commando Regiment, Royal Artillery
 2 (City of Dundee and Highland) Squadron, 32 Signals Regiment (Army Reserve)
Volunteer Cadet Corps

Cadets
The establishment is also home to the Royal Marines Cadets of Arbroath Division Royal Marines Volunteer Cadet Corps.

Built heritage 
The redundant airfield control tower is a category C listed building. The three storey building is one of two surviving examples of this particular type of control tower, which features an ambulance and crash tender garage. The tower, which was listed in May 2006, is noted by Historic Environment Scotland as being important in terms of naval and Second World War history, as well as for its local significance.

The Captain's House, formerly known as 'Woodlands', dates from the early 19th century. The two-storey and basement Regency mansion was listed as category B in June 1971.

See also
 List of air stations of the Royal Navy

References

Citations

Bibliography

External links

Condor
Royal Navy bases in Scotland